Towards Zero is a work of detective fiction by Agatha Christie first published in the US by Dodd, Mead and Company in June 1944, and in the UK by the Collins Crime Club in July of the same year. The first US edition of the novel retailed at $2.00 and the UK edition at seven shillings and sixpence (7/6).

Lady Tressilian invites her ward for his annual visit at Gull's Point. He insists on bringing both his former wife and his present wife, though Lady Tressilian finds this awkward. Her old friend Treves dies, then she is murdered as well; Superintendent Battle and his nephew are called in. The book is the last to feature Superintendent Battle.

The novel was well received at publication, noted for the well-developed characters. A later review called it superb as to the plot, noting also how well the novel depicted the gentlemanly behaviour expected at the main tennis tournament in 1944.

Plot summary
Lady Tressilian is now confined to her bed, but still invites guests to her seaside home at Gull's Point during the summer. Tennis star Nevile Strange, former ward of Lady Tressilian's deceased husband, incurs her displeasure when he proposes to bring both his new wife, Kay, and his former wife, Audrey, to visit at the same time – a change from past years. Lady Tressilian grudgingly agrees to this set of incompatible guests. A long time family friend, Thomas Royde, home after a long stretch working overseas and still faithfully waiting on the sidelines for Audrey, is also a guest.  Staying in hotels nearby are Kay’s friend, Ted Latimer, and Mr Treves, an elderly former solicitor and long time friend of the Tressilians.

The house party feels uncomfortable, as Lady Tressilian had predicted. Invited to a dinner party,  Mr Treves relates a story of an old case, where a child killed another with an arrow, which was ruled an accident, although a local man reported seeing the child practising with a bow and arrow. The child was given a new name and a fresh start. Mr Treves remembers the case and the child because of a distinctive physical feature which he does not reveal. The next morning, Treves is found dead in his hotel room and his death is attributed to heart failure from climbing up the stairs to his room the previous night, greatly upsetting Lady Tressilian. Thomas and Ted are mystified, as they saw a note stating that the lift was out of order when they walked Treves back. They learn from hotel staff that the lift was in working order that night. His death is ruled to be from natural causes.

When Lady Tressilian is found brutally murdered in her bed, and her maid drugged a few days later, evidence points to Nevile Strange as the murderer as one of his golf clubs is found at the scene with his fingerprints on it. Her heirs are Nevile and Audrey. Nevile's quarrel with Lady Tressilian was also overheard. However when the maid wakes up, she tells Superintendent Battle that she saw Lady Tressilian alive after Nevile's visit to her room, before he left for Easterhead Bay to find Ted. The evidence then points to Audrey: a bloodied glove belonging to her is found in the ivy below her window together with the real murder weapon, fashioned from the handle of a tennis racket and the metal ball from the fireplace fender in Audrey’s room. Mary Aldin relates the story told by Mr Treves, and his claim that he could recognise that child with certainty; Battle is certain that the lift sign was placed in order to silence Mr Treves.

Angus MacWhirter is standing at the cliff where, a year earlier, he had attempted suicide, when Audrey attempts to run off the same cliff. He grabs her before she can jump. She confesses her fear, and he promises that she will be safe. The local drycleaners inadvertently give MacWhirter an uncleaned jacket belonging to someone else. Though he is not one of the party at Gull’s House, he is aware of the progress of the investigation, well reported in the local newspapers. He realises why the jacket has stains in a certain odd pattern. He visits Gull’s Point, and requests Mary Aldin's help to find a rope in the house. They find a large damp rope in an otherwise dusty attic, and she locks the door until the police come.

Battle arrests Audrey on the evidence and her ready admission of guilt. However, he suspects that Audrey is in a similar situation to that of his daughter when she had previously confessed under pressure to a theft she did not commit. MacWhirter meets Battle and tells him what he has learned about this case, including his observation of a man swimming across the creek on the night of the brutal murder, and climbing into the house on a rope. Then, Thomas reveals that Audrey had ended their marriage, not Nevile, as she had grown afraid of him. She had left Nevile and was about to marry Adrian Royde, Thomas's brother, when Adrian was killed in a road accident. With the parties on a motor launch, Battle uses this information to force a confession from Nevile Strange. He was the mastermind behind all the events and circumstances that should have converged into "zero" – the hanging of his first wife for the murder of Lady Tressilian.

Nevile may have been behind two other deaths (Mr Treves and Adrian Royde) but there is insufficient evidence to prosecute. With his confession, the rope, and the ruse with the bell pull explained, Battle charges him with the murder of Lady Tressilian. Audrey seeks out MacWhirter to thank him, and they decide to marry. They will travel to Chile where he begins his new job. Audrey expects that Thomas will come to realize that he really wants to marry Mary Aldin instead.

Characters
 Camilla, Lady Tressilian: chatelaine of her seaside home at Saltcreek, Gull's Point; a widow in her early seventies.
 Mary Aldin: Lady Tressilian's companion, in her mid-thirties.
 Nevile Strange: a handsome athlete and tennis player, 33 years old, former ward of Lady Tressilian's late husband. (It is unaware if it’s intentional but when you remove the first and last letter of his first name, it spells “evil”, acknowledging his true identity)
 Kay Strange: his beautiful, sometimes mercurial and hot-tempered, second wife, 23 years old. 
 Audrey Strange: Strange's first wife, age 32. So cool and quiet, it is almost impossible to know what she is thinking. (The polar opposite of Kay.) She was orphaned young, raised with her cousins and aunt, the Roydes.
 Ted Latimer: a friend of Kay since they were in their mid-teens.
 Thomas Royde: Audrey's cousin, on vacation from his work in Malaysia. Like Audrey, he is introverted and a person of few words.
 Mr Treves: solicitor, an old friend of Lady Tressilian, about 80 years old.
 Angus MacWhirter: man who attempted suicide from the cliff near Lady Tressilian's home, and survives to become a part of the solution to the crime.
 Inspector James Leach: Battle's nephew, assigned to the Saltcreek area.
 Superintendent Battle: Vacationing with his nephew, he is assigned to the case with him; husband and father of five children, the youngest of whom gives him an insight useful to solving this case.

Reception

The review by Maurice Willson Disher in The Times Literary Supplement of 22 July 1944 was overwhelmingly positive: "Undiscriminating admirers of Miss Christie must surely miss the thrill of realizing when she is at her best. If this argument is sound then Towards Zero is for the critical. By virtue of masterly story-telling it makes the welfare of certain persons at a seaside town seem of more importance at the moment than anything else in the world. Mechanized brains may object that the murderer "perfects" his mystery by methods imposed upon fiction's police, but even when the maze is vaguely recognised the tale still grips. The characters become so much a part of the reader's existence that he must know what their ultimate fate may be before he will rest satisfied. How alive they are is apparent when two men, both dogged, laconic, poker-faced, never seem alike. The wife and the ex-wife, who neither like nor dislike one another, also reveal creative power. As an exhibition of the modern brand of human nature, Towards Zero deserves higher praises than any that can be awarded to it as an excellent detective story."

Maurice Richardson in the 6 August 1944 issue of The Observer wrote, "The new Agatha Christie has a deliciously prolonged and elaborate build-up, urbane and cosy like a good cigar and red leather slippers. Poirot is absent physically, but his influence guides the sensitive inspector past the wiles of the carefully planted house party, and with its tortuous double bluff this might well have been a Poirot case. How gratifying to see Agatha Christie keeping the flag of the old classic who-dun-it so triumphantly flying!"

Robert Barnard: "Superb: intricately plotted and unusual. The murder comes later, and the real climax of the murderer's plot only at the end. The ingenuity excuses a degree of far-fetchedness. Highly effective story of the child and the bow-and-arrow (part II, chapter 6) and good characterization of the playboy-sportsman central character – very much of that era when one was expected to behave like a gentleman at Wimbledon."

Publication history
 1944: Dodd Mead and Company (New York), June 1944, Hardcover, 242 pp
 1944: Collins Crime Club (London), July 1944, Hardcover, 160 pp
 1947: Pocket Books (New York), Paperback, 210 pp (Pocket number 398)
 1948: Pan Books, Paperback, 195 pp (Pan number 54)
 1959: Fontana Books (Imprint of HarperCollins), Paperback, 192 pp
 1972: Ulverscroft Large-print Edition, Hardcover, 347 pp; 
 1973: Greenway edition of collected works (William Collins), Hardcover, 224 pp
 1974: Greenway edition of collected works (Dodd Mead), Hardcover, 224 pp; 
 1977: Penguin Books, Paperback, 192 pp
 2012: Center Point USA hardcover edition,  / 9781611734584, 292 pp

In 2010, two Kindle editions were issued: one from HarperCollins, ISBN B0046A9MV8, and one from William Morrow Paperbacks, ISBN B005CL8DA6. Numerous editions of audio books have been issued from May 2004 to February 2010.

The novel was first serialised in Collier's Weekly in three instalments from 6 May (Volume 113, Number 19) to 20 May 1944 (Volume 113, Number 21) under the title Come and Be Hanged! with illustrations by Charles La Salle.

In October and November 1944, it was serialized with illustrations under that same title as a supplement to The Mail (Adelaide), in Australia. Portions are missing from the newspapers scanned by Trove, so the exact dates are not certain, save for the start on 7 October 1944.

Adaptations

Stage
In 1956, Christie adapted the book into a play with Gerald Verner. It was first published by Samuel French Ltd. in 1957. The play was first staged in September 1956 at the St James Theatre in the West End of London. Christie first wrote a stage play under this title in 1945, with one week of performances in Martha's Vineyard. The script was uncovered in 2015 by Julius Green.

Towards Zero was included in the 1978 Christie play collection, The Mousetrap and Other Plays.

It was performed in 2019 at The Maddermarket Theatre, Norwich, England, using the play as written by Agatha Christie in 1945 and recently "unearthed by author Julius Green." As the only prior staging using this script was in Martha's Vineyard in the United States, the theatre claims this as the first performance of this version of the 1945 stage play in Europe.

Film
In 1995, a film adaptation lost its support from Agatha Christie's estate. When Rosalind Hicks, Christie's daughter and controller of her estate, reviewed the script, with such issues as incest in the script, she ordered that the name of the film be changed as well as the names of the characters. The film became Innocent Lies and was met with mediocre success.

In 2007, French filmmakers adapted the novel to Towards Zero, titled in French as L'Heure Zéro.

Television
In 2007, the novel was adapted as part of the third season of the Agatha Christie's Marple  television series produced by ITV. Geraldine McEwan plays Miss Marple. The novel did not include Miss Marple; other characters are changed as well for this adaptation to fit the series approach. Superintendent Battle is replaced by Superintendent Mallard played by Alan Davies.

In 2019, the novel was again adapted as an episode of French television series Les Petits Meurtres d'Agatha Christie.

Radio
In 2010, Joy Wilkinson adapted Towards Zero as a radio play, first transmitted in January 2010, in four parts, each 30 minutes by BBC Radio 4. The cast includes:

Nevile – Hugh Bonneville
Lady Tresselian – Marcia Warren
Tom MacWhirter – Tom Mannion
Audrey – Claire Rushbrook
Mary – Julia Ford
Kay – Lizzy Watts
Latimer – Joseph Kloska
Royde – Stephen Hogan
Treves, Constable – David Hargreaves
Umpire/Butler, Inspector Leach – Philip Fox
Receptionist – Annabelle Dowler
Porter, Doctor Lazenby – Benjamin Askew
Sergeant – Matt Addis

References

External links
Towards Zero at the official Agatha Christie website
Towards Zero at the new Agatha Christie official website
Dustjacket of the first US edition at the New York Public Library digital gallery

1944 British novels
Novels by Agatha Christie
Plays by Agatha Christie
1956 plays
Novels first published in serial form
Works originally published in Collier's
Dodd, Mead & Co. books
British novels adapted into films
British novels adapted into television shows
Superintendent Battle

sr:Нулта тачка